Mount Williams is a  glaciated mountain summit located in the Chugach Mountains in the U.S. state of Alaska. Although modest in elevation, relief is significant as it rises over 5,000 feet (1,500 m) in less than one mile from the immense Childs Glacier. 

The peak was named in 1910 by Lawrence Martin for Alfred Williams, assistant engineer for the Copper River and Northwestern Railway, which built a $1,500,000 steel bridge across the Copper River near this mountain in 1909-1910. The mountain's name was officially adopted in 1930 by the U.S. Board on Geographic Names.

Climate

Based on the Köppen climate classification, Mount Williams is located in a subpolar oceanic climate zone, with long, cold, snowy winters, and cool summers. Winds coming off the Gulf of Alaska are forced upwards by the Chugach Mountains (orographic lift), causing heavy precipitation in the form of rainfall and snowfall. Temperatures can drop below −20 °C with wind chill factors below −30 °C. This climate supports the Childs Glacier to the south, and Allen Glacier to the north. The months May through June offer the most favorable weather for viewing and climbing.

See also

List of mountain peaks of Alaska
Geography of Alaska

References

External links

 Weather forecast: Mount Williams

Williams
Williams